This is a list of awards and nominations received by Infinite, a South Korean boy group that debuted on 9 June 2010 under Woollim Entertainment.

Awards and nominations

Listicles

Notes

References 

Infinite
Awards